Dogma is an established belief, doctrine or set of theological tenets.

Dogma may also refer to:

Film and television
Dogma (film), a 1999 film by Kevin Smith
Dogma (studio), a Japanese adult video company
Dogma (TV series), a 2017–2018 Mexican anthology series

Music
The Dogma, an Italian metal band
Dogma, an Australian group, best known for their 2002 single, "Step into the Music"
Dogma (Tall Dwarfs album), 1987
Dogma (The Gazette album) or the title song, 2015
Dogma: Music from the Motion Picture, a soundtrack album from the 1999 film
Dogma, an EP by Mr FijiWiji, 2016
"Dogma", a song by KMFDM from Xtort, 1996
"Dogma", a song by Marilyn Manson from Portrait of an American Family, 1994
"I. Dogma", a song by Mick Gordon from Doom, 2016

Other uses
DOGMA (Developing Ontology-Grounded Methods and Applications), a computer science research project
Dogma, a 2012 novel by Lars Iyer

See also
Dogmatic (film), a 1999 Canadian-American television film
Dogmatix, a fictional dog in the Asterix series 
Dogme 95, a filmmaking method